Martha Brown was an American figure skater.  In 1920, she won the silver medal at the U.S. Figure Skating Championships. She represented the Skating Club of Boston.

Competitive highlights

References
 
 

American female single skaters
Year of birth missing
Year of death missing